Rescue Me is a British romantic comedy television series produced by Tiger Aspect Productions and broadcast on BBC One in 2002. It was created, and principally written, by David Nicholls and stars Sally Phillips as Katie Nash, a woman who is recovering from a divorce while at the same time writing relationship features for Eden, the women's magazine she works on. The series was filmed from November to December 2001. It ran for six episodes, averaging 3.4 million viewers and a 15% audience share in its Sunday night timeslot. The low ratings meant it was not recommissioned for a second series, leaving an unresolved cliffhanger. Nicholls had written four episodes of the unmade second series before discovering Rescue Me had been cancelled. As a result, he took a break from screenwriting to concentrate on his debut novel Starter for Ten. A cover version of "Rescue Me", performed by Oliver Darley, is the series theme tune.

Cast
Sally Phillips as Katie Nash, a feature writer on a magazine.
Stewart Wright as Eddie Chisholm, the sub-editor who is Katie's shoulder to cry on.
Oliver Chris as Luke Chatwin, the humorous photographer.
James Lance as Guy, the magazine art director.
Eliza Bennett as Natasha Bell, the deputy editor.
Vincent Regan as Matthew Nash, Katie's husband.
Sasha Behar as Emma Peters, the editor.
Andrea Lowe as Melanie Woods, Emma's PA.

Episodes

References

External links
Rescue Me at bbc.co.uk
Rescue Me at Tiger Aspect Productions

2000s British comedy-drama television series
2000s British romantic comedy television series
2002 British television series debuts
2002 British television series endings
BBC television dramas
Works by David Nicholls
Television series by Endemol